Hugh II was Judge of Arborea, reigning from 1321 CE until his death in 1336 CE. He was the illegitimate son of Marianus III of Arborea and Paulesa de Serra.

Hugh sided with James II of Aragon, who had been invested with the Kingdom of Sardinia and Corsica by Pope Boniface VIII in 1297. He became vassal of James for Arborea and probably wanted to expand his control over the whole island, as governor on behalf of the Catalan Crown. To this end, he assisted the future Alfonso IV in the conquest of 1323 – 1324, when the Republic of Pisa was expelled from the island. After Alfonso's army disembarked at Palmas, Hugh joined him at the siege of Villa di Chiesa (modern Iglesias). He was present, too, at the fall of Castel di Castro on June 1324.  Hugh II died of an unknown illness in 1336.

Family
Hugh married Benedetta (died circa 1345). They had nine children:
Peter III, his successor
Marianus IV, brother's successor
Bonaventure (died 1375)
Francis (died 1342), canon of Urgell
Mary (died 1392), married Guillem Galceran de Rocabertí
John (died 1375), rebelled against brother Marianus and imprisoned
Nicholas (died 1370), canon of Lleida, grandfather of Leonard Cubello
Angiolesa
Preciosa

Hugh also had an illegitimate son:
Lawrence, legitimised 1337

Sources
Hillgarth, Jocelyn N. The Spanish Kingdoms, 1250–1516: 1250–1410 Precarious Balance. Oxford University Press: 1976.

1336 deaths
Judges (judikes) of Arborea
Year of birth unknown